is a 2008 Japanese film written and directed by Tetsuya Nakashima, based on a play by Hirohito Gotō.

It was shown at the Munich Asian Filmfest in 2008 and has been nominated for three awards for the 2009 Asian Film Awards. Actors Kōji Yakusho and Ayaka Wilson and director Tetsuya Nakashima have been nominated for the 2008 Japanese Academy Award.

Synopsis
The movie is set in a hospital where "strange" people are sent.

One of the older, gruffer patients, is Onuki, a business owner who is sent to the hospital after a heart attack, thinks little of the other hospital patients, and hopes to die without being remembered by such "worthless" people. Another patient, a young girl named Paco, is in the hospital due to a memory disorder- she can only remember the events of one day at a time. Each day she reads a pop-up children's book, and often asks Onuki to read to her. Each day it is a new story for her.

Eventually, the two of them develop a friendship, and Onuki decides to enlist the help of the other people in the hospital to perform a play of the book, hoping it will help Paco.

Cast
Ōnuki (Prince Gama): Kōji Yakusho
Paco: Ayaka Wilson
Muromachi (the demon crawfish): Satoshi Tsumabuki
Tamako (the ricefish): Anna Tsuchiya
Horigome (the dragonfly larva): Sadao Abe
Kōichi (the water strider): Ryō Kase
Masami (the swamp shrimp witch): Eiko Koike
Ryūmonji (the whirligig beetle): Takaya Yamauchi
Kinomoto (Queen Gama): Jun Kunimura
Takita (the fish): Gekidan Hitori
Asano (the pond snail): Takaya Kamikawa

References

External links
Official Site 

2008 films
2000s Japanese-language films
Films directed by Tetsuya Nakashima
Japanese films based on plays
Japanese fantasy drama films
Films set in hospitals
Films about amnesia
Toho films
Cross-dressing in film
Films about theatre
Films with live action and animation
2000s Japanese films